The 2014 Meath Intermediate Football Championship is the 88th edition of the Meath GAA's premier club Gaelic football tournament for intermediate graded teams in County Meath, Ireland. The tournament consists of 18 teams, with the winner going on to represent Meath in the Leinster Intermediate Club Football Championship. The championship starts with a group stage and then progresses to a knock out stage.

The draw for the group stages of the championship were made on 10 February 2014 with the games commencing on the weekend of 11 April 2014.

Drumbaragh Emmets were promoted to the middle grade after securing the J.F.C. crown last year. Kilmainham joined them after finishing as J.F.C. runners-up last year.

This was Nobber's return to the Intermediate grade after 3 years as a senior club since being relegated last year.

Carnaross were relegated to the Junior 'A' championship for 2015 after 15 years in the middle grade since being relegated from the S.F.C. in 1999. In this period they reached two finals losing to Navan O'Mahonys and Nobber in 2003 and 2010 respectively. It was 24 years since Carnaross were last in the Junior grade.

On 5 October 2014, Ballinlough won their third IFC crown, defeating Ballinabrackey in the final and hence ending a seven year exodus from the SFC. They succeeded Gaeil Colmcille as Intermediate champions.

Team changes
The following teams have changed division since the 2013 championship season.

From I.F.C.
Promoted to S.F.C.
 Gaeil Colmcille  -  (Intermediate Champions)

To I.F.C.
Relegated from 2013 S.F.C.
 Nobber

Promoted from 2013 J.F.C.
 Drumbaragh Emmets - (Junior 'A' Champions)
 Kilmainham - (Junior 'A' Runner-Up)

Participating teams
The teams taking part in the 2014 Meath Intermediate Football Championship are:

Group stage

There are 3 groups called Group A,B and C. The 2 top finishers in each group and the third place finisher in Group A will qualify for the Quarter Finals. The third placed teams in Group B and C will qualify for a Preliminary Quarter Final, with the winner earning a place in last eight. The bottom finishers of each group will qualify for the Relegation Play Off. The draw for the group stages of the championship were made on 10 February 2014 with the games commencing on the weekend of 11 April 2014.

Group A

Round 1
 Kilmainham 0-10, 2-9 Ballinabrackey, Trim, 12/4/2014,
 Castletown 0-17, 1-9 St. Michael's, Kilmainhamwood, 12/4/2014,
 Longwood 1-8, 1-9 Dunderry, Trim, 13/4/2014,

Round 2
 St. Michael's 1-3, 0-9 Longwood, Kildalkey, 19/4/2014,
 Dunderry 0-11, 0-9 Kilmainham, Pairc Tailteann, 19/4/2014,
 Ballinabrackey 0-8, 2-12 Castletown, Athboy, 26/4/2014,

Round 3
 Longwood 0-9, 3-18 Castletown, Bective, 16/5/2014,
 Dunderry 0-10, 0-8 Ballinabrackey, Summerhill, 17/5/2014,
 St. Michael's 1-15, 0-13 Kilmainham, Moynalty, 24/5/2014,

Round 4
 Ballinabrackey 0-10, 0-7 St. Michael's, Trim, 16/8/2014,
 Kilmainham 0-11, 0-14 Longwood, Trim, 16/8/2014,
 Castletown 0-9, 1-7 Dunderry, Bective, 16/8/2014,

Round 5
 Castletown 3-14, 1-9 Kilmainham, Moynalty, 29/8/2014,
 St. Michael's 0-12, 1-14 Dunderry, Kilmainham, 30/8/2014,
 Longwood 1-7, 0-11 Ballinabrackey, Trim, 30/8/2014,

Group B

Round 1
 Drumbaragh Emmets 0-13, 2-14 Trim, Simonstown, 11/4/2014,
 Syddan 2-7, 1-10 Nobber, Drumconrath, 13/4/2014,
 St. Colmcille's 2-8, 0-9 Ballinlough, Castletown, 13/4/2014,

Round 2
 Trim 1-11, 1-12 Syddan, Simomnstown, 20/4/2014,
 Nobber 0-7, 0-14 St. Colmcille's, Donore, 24/4/2014,
 Ballinlough 2-7, 2-15 Drumbaragh Emmets, Moylagh, 27/4/2014,

Round 3
 Trim 0-11, 1-14 St. Colmcille's, Rathkenny, 18/5/2014,
 Syddan 3-16, 1-6 Drumbaragh Emmets, Meath Hill, 23/5/2014,
 Nobber 0-12, 2-15 Ballinlough, Carlanstown, 25/5/2014,

Round 4
 St. Colmcille's 0-12, 0-15 Syddan, Rathkenny, 16/8/2014,
 Drumbaragh Emmets 1-7, 1-14 Nobber, Kilmainhamwood, 17/8/2014,
 Ballinlough 0-10, 0-10 Trim, Bohermeen, 17/8/2014,

Round 5
 Trim 1-10, 0-9 Nobber, Bohermeen, 31/8/2014,
 Syddan 2-6, 1-18 Ballinlough, Carlanstown, 31/8/2014, 
 Drumbaragh Emmets 1-12, 0-13 St. Colmcille's, Slane, 31/8/2014,

Group C

Round 1
 Carnaross 1-7, 2-16 Ballivor, Pairc Tailteann, 12/4/2014,
 Ratoath 4-13, 2-7 St. Ultan's, Walterstown, 13/4/2014,
 Clann na nGael 1-7, 0-8 Donaghmore/Ashbourne 'B', Dunsany, 13/4/2014,

Round 2
 Ballivor 2-10, 2-9 Ratoath, Dunsany, 19/4/2014,
 St. Ultan's 1-12, 4-10 Clann na nGael, Kells, 20/4/2014,
 Donaghmore/Ashbourne 'B' 0-15, 1-8 Carnaross, Trim, 26/4/2014,

Round 3
 Ballivor 0-15, 2-7 St Ultan's, Athboy, 18/5/2014,
 Donaghmore/Ashbourne 'B' 1-3, 2-15 Ratoath, Skryne, 23/5/2014,
 Carnaross 1-9, 0-8 Clann na nGael, Kells, 24/5/2014,

Round 4
 Clann na nGael 0-4, 2-17 Ballivor, Trim, 15/8/2014,
 St Ultan's 0-11, 0-8 Donaghmore/Ashbourne 'B', Seneschalstown, 16/8/2014,
 Ratoath 2-15, 1-9 Carnaross, Trim, 17/8/2014,

Round 5
 Donaghmore/Ashbourne 'B' 0-9, 0-10 Ballivor, Kilmessan, 31/8/2014,
 Carnaross 1-7, 1-10 St Ultan's, Kilmainham, 31/8/2014,
 Clann na nGael 1-9, 3-17 Ratoath, Walterstown, 31/8/2014,

Knock-out Stages

Relegation Play Off
The three bottom finishers from each group qualify for the relegation play off and play each other in a round robin basis.
The team with the worst record after two matches will be relegated to the 2015 Junior Championship.

 Game 1: Kilmainham 3-12, 2-14 Nobber, Simonstown, 7/9/2014,
 Game 2: Nobber 0-14, 0-13 Carnaross, Drumbaragh, 14/9/2014,
 Game 3: Carnaross 0-9, 1-13 Kilmainham, Pairc Tailteann, 20/9/2014,

Finals
The winners and runners up of each group qualify for the quarter finals along with the third placed finisher of Group A.

Preliminary Quarter-Final:
 Ballinlough 1-12, 0-6 Clann na nGael, Millbrook 8/9/2014,

Quarter-Final:
 Ballivor 0-8, 2-12 Ballinabrackey, Trim, 13/9/2014,
 Syddan 3-14, 3-19 Ratoath, Pairc Tailteann, 13/9/2014, (A.E.T.) 
 Dunderry 0-11, 1-12 Ballinlough, Moylagh, 14/9/2014,
 St. Colmcille's 2-11, 1-18 Castletown, Rathkenny, 14/9/2014,

Semi-Finals:
 Ballinlough 2-14, 2-12 Castletown, Pairc Tailteann, 20/9/2014,
 Ratoath 1-10, 1-11 Ballinabrackey, Trim, 21/9/2014,

Final:
 Ballinlough 1-12, 1-9 Ballinabrackey, Pairc Tailteann, 5/10/2014,

Leinster Intermediate Club Football Championship
Preliminary Round:
 Ballyfin 0-8, 0-11 Ballinlough, O'Moore Park, 25/10/2014,

Quarter-Final
 Ballinlough 0-12, 0-10 Raheen, Pairc Tailteann, 2/11/2014,

Semi-Final:
 St. James' 1-3, 0-12 Ballinlough, Wexford Park, 16/11/2014,

Final:
 Seán O'Mahonys 0-10, 1-4 Ballinlough, Drogheda Park, 30/11/2014,

References

External links

Meath Intermediate Football Championship
Meath Intermediate Football Championship